Johann Jacob Schweppe (16 March 1740 – 18 November 1821) was a German-Swiss watchmaker and amateur scientist who developed the first practical process to manufacture bottled carbonated mineral water, based on a process discovered by Joseph Priestley in 1767. His company, Schweppes, regards Priestley as “the father of our industry”.

Biography 
Schweppe was born in Witzenhausen in the Landgraviate of Hesse-Kassel. He moved to Geneva in 1765 to work as a watchmaker and jeweler. He founded the Schweppes Company there in 1783 to produce carbonated water. Ginger ale was first produced by Schweppe in 1783 in Genf. 

At the time Schweppe was developing these products, the addition of carbon dioxide to water was considered to have medicinal properties. In 1792, he moved to London to develop the business there, but it was not successful and failed in 1795. However, Erasmus Darwin, the grandfather of Charles Darwin, began talking up the beverage, which started to become popular. Schweppe returned to Geneva and died in 1821. In 1831, King William IV of the United Kingdom adopted the beverage, enabling use the famous "by appointment to". Subsequently, carbonated water became very popular.

References 

18th-century German inventors
Clockmakers from the Republic of Geneva
1740 births
1821 deaths
People from Witzenhausen
Scientists from Hesse